Bertram Mitford  (13 June 1855 – 4 October 1914) was a colonial writer, novelist, essayist and cultural critic who wrote forty-four books, most of which are set in South Africa.

He was a contemporary of H Rider Haggard. A member of the Mitford family, he was the third son of Edward Ledwich Osbaldeston Mitford (1811–1912). The latter became the 31st Lord of the Manor of Mitford in 1895 (following the death of his brother Colonel John Philip Osbaldeston Mitford) and died at Mitford Hall, Northumberland, in 1912.

Bertram Mitford was born in Bath in 1855, educated at Hurstpierpoint College in Sussex, went to South Africa in 1874, living in Cheltenham 1881, married Zima Helen Gentle, daughter of Alfred Ebden, 9 March 1886 in Brighton, had daughter Yseulte Helen 3 June 1887 (died July 1969), had son Roland Bertram 17 June 1891 (died 16 April 1932), living in London 1891, and died in Cowfold, Sussex of liver disease in 1914.

He belonged to four London clubs: Junior Athenaeum, Savage, New Vagabond, and Wigwam.

Partial bibliography
Our arms in Zululand –  1881 – poems
Through the Zululand – 1883 – non fiction
The Fire Trumpet 	– Blackett 	1889	
The Weird of Deadly Hollow –	Sutton 	1891 	
Golden Face 	– Trischler –	1892 	
Tween Snow and Fire- Heinemann – 	Cassell 	1892 	
The Curses of Clement Waynflete –	Ward 	1894 	
The King's Assegai – 	Chatto 	-1894 	
The Luck of Gerard Ridgeley – 	Chatto 	1894 	
Renshaw Fanning's Quest – Chatto 	1894 	
The White Shield 	– Cassell 	1895 	
A Veldt Official 	– Ward 	1895 	
The Sign of the Spider –	Methuen 	1896 	
The Expiation of Wynne Palliser 	– Ward 	1896 	
Fordham's Feud –	Ward 	1897 	
The Induna's Wife – 	White 	1898 	
The Ruby Sword –	White 	1899 	
The Gun-Runner –	Chatto 	1899 	
Aletta 	– White 	1900 	
John Ames, Native Commissioner 	– White 	1900 	
The Triumph of Hilary Blachland 	– Chatto 	1901 	
The Word of the Sorceress 	– Hutchinson 	1902 	
A Veldt Vendetta – 	Ward 	1903 	
Dorrien of Cranston – 	Hurst 	1903 	
Forging the Blades –	Nash 	1903 	
Haviland's Chum 	– Chatto 	1903 	
In the Whirl of the Rising – 	Methuen 	1904 	
The Red Derelict 	– Methuen 	1904 	
The Sirdar's Oath 	– White 	1904 	
A Frontier Mystery 	– White 	1905 	
A Secret of the Lebombo –	Hurst 	1905 	
Harley Greenoak's Charge –	Chatto 	1906 	
The White Hand and the Black – 	Long 	1907 	
A Legacy of the Granite Hills –	Long 	1909 	
A Border Scourge –	Long 	1910 	
A Duel Resurrection – 	Ward 	1910 	
Ravenshaw of Rietholme – 	Ward 	1910 	
The Heath Hover Mystery –	Ward 	1911 	
The River of Unrest –	Ward 	1912 	
Seaford's snake 	– Ward 	1912 	
Selmin of Selmingfold 	– Ward 	1912 	
Averno 	– Ward 	1913 	
An Island of Eden – 	Ward 	1913

References

"Colonial Voices" Prof Gerald Monsman
 Burke's Peerage 107th edition

External links
 
 
 

19th-century English novelists
20th-century English novelists
1855 births
1914 deaths
People educated at Hurstpierpoint College
Deaths from liver disease
Bertram
Victorian novelists
English male novelists
Fellows of the Royal Geographical Society
People from Bath, Somerset
People from Cowfold